Dark Light or Darklight may refer to:

Literature
 Dark Light (Ken MacLeod novel) (2002)
 Dark Light, a 2008 novel by Jayne Castle
 Darklight, a follow-up novel to Wondrous Strange by Lesley Livingston
 The Dark Light, a 1998 novel by Mette Newth
 The Dark Light, a 2012 novel by Sara Walsh
 Dark Light, a 2006 novel by Randy Wayne White

Film and television
 The Dark Light (film), a 1951 Hammer Film Productions thriller
 Darklight (film), a 2004 TV fantasy thriller
 "The Dark Light" (Yu-Gi-Oh! GX), an episode of Yu-Gi-Oh! GX
 Darklight Film Festival

Music
 Darklight, a solo project of Kátai Tamás

Albums
 Dark Light (East 17 album)
 Dark Light (HIM album) (2005)
 Dark Light (Gary Numan album)
 A Dark Light, a 2002 album by Waterson–Carthy

Songs
 "Dark Light", a song by KISS from Music from "The Elder"

Other uses
Dark light (vision) or eigengrau, the color seen by the eye in perfect darkness
Dark light, a theoretical force that only interacts with dark matter
Darklight Conflict, a computer game
CyberMage: Darklight Awakening, a computer game
The Dark Light Device from Luigi's Mansion Dark Moon, and Luigi's Mansion 3

See also 

Black Light (disambiguation)
Dark energy
Dark Force (disambiguation)
Darklighters, demonic fictional characters in Charmed
Biggs Darklighter, a fictional character from Star Wars
Gavin Darklighter, a fictional character from Star Wars Legends